Mary Marguerite Adams aka June Mary Adams (1910–1973) was an American actress. She is best known as a television character actor from the 1950s. She was a regular, usually cast as a dowdy nurse or wife, and is best remembered as the day nurse in The Twilight Zone: "Twenty Two".

Life
She was born on June 27, 1910 in Ogden, Utah.

She began acting late in life (38) but was a popular choice in supporting roles throughout the 1950s to the degree that she could be called a "familiar face". Her career faded in the early 1960s.

She died on November 30, 1973 in Los Angeles. She is buried in Kensico Cemetery in Valhalla, New York.

Career

Television
 
Stars Over Hollywood: "The Ageless" (1951)
The George Burns and Gracie Allen Show (1951/2)
Craig Kennedy, Criminologist (three episodes, 1952) various roles
Life With Father (pilot episode 1953)
I Led 3 Lives (1953) as Mrs Ives
Big Town (1955)
The Father Who Had No Sons (TV movie, 1955)
Front Row Center (1955) as Miss Jenny
Medic (two episodes, 1955) as Sister Benedict
Captain Midnight (1955) as Mrs Harper
Matinee Theatre: "Statute of Limitations" (1956) as Mom
Gunsmoke (1956) as Nettie
The Adventures of Rin Tin Tin (1956) as Mrs Mack
Crusader (1956) as Vera Nelson
Sergeant Preston of the Yukon (1956) as Alice Burns
Father Knows Best (2 episodes 1956) 
Lux Video Theatre (4 episodes, 1955–1957)
The O. Henry Playhouse: "Christmas By Injunction" (1957)
Have Gun - Will Travel (1957) as Maggie
Decision (1958) as Sara Radford
The Donna Reed Show (1958) as nurse
M Squad (2 episodes 1958–59)
Playhouse 90 (1959) as Mrs Haywood
Adventure Showcase: "Doctor Mike" (1959) as Mary Barker
Hawaiian Eye (1959) as Esther
Riverboat (1959) as Mrs Wilkins
Dennis the Menace (1960) as Helen Forbes
The Twilight Zone: "Twenty Two" (1961) as nurse
The Loretta Young Show (two episodes 1959–61) as mother
Wagon Train (1961) as Julia
Whispering Smith (1961) as Mrs Landers
Window on Main Street (5 episodes, 1961) as Lavinia Webster
It's a Man's World (1962) as Mrs Meredith
The Untouchables (1962) as Kate Brannon
The Alfred Hitchcock Hour: "The Lonely Hours" (1963) as the nurse
My Three Sons (2 episodes, 1961 and 1964) 
The File on Devlin (1969) as the maid

Film
Hazard (1948) as Matron Sergeant
Night Has a Thousand Eyes (1948) as Miss Hendricks
For the Love of Mary (1948) as Marge
Starlift (1951) as Sue Wayne (uncredited)
Bugles in the Afternoon (1952) (uncredited)
Executive Suite (1954) as Sara Asenith Grimm
Her Twelve Men (1954) as Martha the school nurse (uncredited)
Rebel in Town (1956) as Grandma Ackstadt
Blood of Dracula aka Blood is My Heritage (1957) as Mrs Thorndyke
Diary of a Madman (1963) as Louise the Cook (with Vincent Price)
The Day They Gave Babies Away (1957) as Mrs Roscoe (uncredited)
The Clown and the Kid (1961) as Mother Superior (uncredited)
Doctors' Wives (1971) as nurse (uncredited)

References

1910 births
1973 deaths
20th-century American actresses
People from Ogden, Utah
Actresses from Utah
American television actresses
American film actresses
Burials at Kensico Cemetery